Enid Wilson (15 March 1910 – 14 January 1996) was an English amateur golfer. She was a semi-finalist at her first British Ladies Amateur Golf Championship in 1927 and won the Championship three years in a row between 1931 and 1933.

Competing in the 1931 U.S. Women's Amateur, Wilson was eliminated in the semi-finals by ultimate champion Helen Hicks. She got some measure of satisfaction the next year when she beat Hicks 2 & 1 in their match during the first ever Curtis Cup held at the Wentworth Golf Club, in Surrey, England. She returned to the U.S. for the 1932 Amateur but went out in the quarter-final. In the 1933 U.S. Amateur she lost in the semi-finals to the ultimate tournament champion Virginia Van Wie but won the medal for lowest round with a record-setting score.

In 1933, Wilson partnered with Walter Hagen to play a match at the Bruntsfield Links in Edinburgh, Scotland. She  co-wrote So That's What I Do!  with Robert Allen Lewis that was published in 1935. She also wrote the section on women's golf in the 1952 book A History of Golf in Britain (1990 Reprint Ailsa Inc.) edited by golf writer  Bernard Darwin and contributed to by several notables from the world of British men's golf. As well, she wrote 'A Gallery of Women Golfers'' with the foreword by Bernard Darwin that was published in 1961 in London by Country Life Ltd.

Team appearancesAmateur'''
Curtis Cup (representing Great Britain & Ireland): 1932

English female golfers
Amateur golfers
Winners of ladies' major amateur golf championships
1910 births
1996 deaths